Dhak Plahi  is a village in Phagwara Tehsil in Kapurthala district of Punjab State, India. The village is administrated by a Sarpanch, who is an elected representative.

Demography 
According to the report published by Census India in 2011, Dhak Plahi has 54 houses with the total population of 263 persons of which 146 are male and 117 females. Literacy rate of Dhak Plahi is 82.45%, higher than the state average of 75.84%.  The population of children in the age group 0–6 years is 18 which is 6.84% of the total population.  Child sex ratio is approximately 1571, higher than the state average of 846.

As per census 2011, 90 people were engaged in work activities out of the total population of Dhak Plahi which includes 87 males and 3 females. According to census survey report 2011, 93.33% workers (Employment or Earning more than 6 Months) describe their work as main work and 6.67% workers are involved in Marginal activity providing livelihood for less than 6 months.

Population data

Caste  
The village has schedule caste (SC) constitutes 50.95% of total population of the village and it doesn't have any Schedule Tribe (ST) population.

References

External links
  Villages in Kapurthala
 Kapurthala Villages List

Villages in Kapurthala district